Trial by Fire is a book written by attorney Gerry Spence, which recounts the events surrounding the libel lawsuit brought by former Miss Wyoming Kim Pring against Penthouse Magazine in 1980. Pring had been sexually ridiculed in Hustler magazine after becoming Miss Wyoming, and Spence argued that her right to privacy as a non-public persona had been violated.

Law books
Works about freedom of expression
Works about privacy
1986 non-fiction books
William Morrow and Company books